Johann Hörmayer (born 25 May 1942) is an Austrian football player and coach.

References

1942 births
Living people
Austrian footballers
Austria international footballers
Wiener Sport-Club players
First Vienna FC players
Association football goalkeepers
Austrian football managers
Wiener Sport-Club managers